Evan Matthew Wickham (born May 14, 1981) is an American Christian musician and pastor who primarily plays a contemporary Christian music and worship style of music. He has released four studio albums, Mysterious Things in 2006, Above the Sky in 2009, Christmas Music Vol. 1 in 2012, and Make Us One in 2013, all independently released.

Early life
Wickham was born on May 14, 1981, in San Diego, California, whose parents John and Lisa Wickham (née, Irwin), were in the band Parable, where she was the lead vocalist and his father a lead guitarist. He was raised in the church by his parents, where his father is a worship pastor at Maranatha Chapel. His younger brother is Phil Wickham, and he has a younger sister, Jillian.

Music career
His music recording career began in 2006 with the studio album Mysterious Things released on April 6, 2006. He released Above the Sky on December 4, 2009. He also released Christmas Music Vol. 1 on October 12, 2012. The subsequent album, Make Us One, was released on December 2, 2013, independently as well.

Personal life
Wickham was based in Vista, California, where he used to lead worship at Calvary Chapel. During this time Evan also served terms as the Middle School Pastor and High School Pastor. He was known for his passion for worship, theology, and opening his home to the youth group. His ministering career after Calvary Chapel directed him towards the Horizon Christian Fellowship in his hometown, where he was the worship pastor. In 2013 he relocated to Portland, Oregon, where he was an elder and pastor of worship at The Westside branch of A Jesus Church. In 2017 he and his family moved back to San Diego, California and opened Park Hill Church. Wickham currently lives in San Diego with his wife Sandy, whom he met when he was 15 years old,

Discography
Albums
 Mysterious Things (April 6, 2006)
 Above the Sky (December 4, 2009)
 Christmas Music Vol. 1 (October 2, 2012)
 Make Us One (December 2, 2013)
Yes

References

External links
 Official website
 Evan Wickham's Worship Leader article

1981 births
Living people
American performers of Christian music
Musicians from California
Musicians from San Diego
Musicians from Portland, Oregon
Songwriters from California
Songwriters from Oregon